Grbić is a Serbo-Croatian surname. It may refer to:

Adrian Grbić (born 1996), Austrian footballer
Borivoje Grbić (born 1972), Serbian comic-book and graphic novel creator
Branislav Grbić, the Kosovo "Minister for Return and Communities"
Čedo Grbić (1921–1994), Croatian Serb politician
Denis Grbić (born 1986), Slovenian footballer
Itana Grbić (born 1996), Montenegrin handball player
Ivo Grbić (1931–2020), Croatian artist
Ivo Grbić (born 1996), Croatian football goalkeeper
Maja Grbić (born 1980), Serbian politician
Marija Omaljev-Grbić (born 1982), Croatian actress
Matija Grbić (1505–1559), Croatian-German humanist, classical philologist and translator native
Miodrag Grbić (1901–1969), Serbian archeologist and custos
Miraj Grbić (born 1976), Bosnian-American actor
Nikola Grbić (born 1973), Serbian volleyball player
Petar Grbić (born 1988), Montenegrin footballer
Rade Grbić (1870–1910) United States Navy sailor and a recipient of the Medal of Honor
Vladimir Grbić (born 1970), former Serbian volleyball player

Serbian surnames
Croatian surnames
Montenegrin surnames